E. J. Lowe may refer to:
Edward Joseph Lowe (1825–1900), British botanist
E. J. Lowe (philosopher) (1950–2014), British philosopher